The King and the Chorus Girl is a 1937 American romantic comedy film directed by Mervyn LeRoy and starring Fernand Gravey, Joan Blondell and Edward Everett Horton.

Gravey (billed as "Gravet") was at the time the subject of a significant studio publicity campaign to build his image.

The film is notable for being the only one with a screenplay officially credited to Groucho Marx.

Plot
Alfred VII is a young and rich deposed King in exile in Paris and monumentally bored.  When he becomes involved with a chorus girl whom he accidentally insults (by falling asleep), her indignation provides an opportunity for his loyal courtiers to bring him back to life.

Cast 
 Fernand Gravey as Alfred Bruger VII
 Joan Blondell as Miss Dorothy Ellis
 Edward Everett Horton as Count Humbert Evel Bruger
 Alan Mowbray as Donald Taylor
 Mary Nash as Duchess Anna of Elberfield
 Jane Wyman as Babette Latour
 Luis Alberni as Gaston
 Lionel Pape as Professor Kornisch
 Kenny Baker as Folies Bergère Soloist
 Al Shaw and Sam Lee (Shaw and Lee) as Folies Bergère Entertainers
 unbilled players include Virginia Dabney and Carole Landis

External links 
 
 
 
 

1937 films
Films directed by Mervyn LeRoy
Warner Bros. films
American romantic comedy films
1937 romantic comedy films
Films set in Paris
American black-and-white films
1930s English-language films
1930s American films